Anne Patzwald (born 2 July 1989, Guben, East Germany) is a German 1.0 point wheelchair basketball player, who played for the German national team at the 2016 Summer Paralympics in Rio de Janeiro, winning silver. President Joachim Gauck awarded the team Germany's highest sporting honour, the Silbernes Lorbeerblatt (Silver Laurel Leaf).

Biography
Anne Patzwald was born in Guben on 2 July 1989. She became a paraplegic after an accident. She began playing wheelchair basketball in 2012. Playing sport was a part of her rehabilitation, and she considered wheelchair basketball, table tennis and badminton.  When she returned home, she found that one of her neighbours played wheelchair basketball, and began playing in the local league too.

Patzwald is graded a 1.0 point player. She was selected as part of the under 25 national team in 2013, and the senior team the following year. In 2015, she won gold with the team in the European Championship in Worcester, England. She made her Paralympic debut at the 2016 Summer Paralympic Games in Rio de Janeiro, where the German team won silver. President Joachim Gauck awarded the team Germany's highest sporting honour, the Silbernes Lorbeerblatt (Silver Laurel Leaf) in 2016.

Patzwald trained as an occupational therapist at a school in  that did not require school fees and was wheelchair accessible. The clinic has a record of hiring athletes, who double as role models, and is generous allowing them to take time off for national team training and competitions. Its staff includes fellow national wheelchair basketball team member Maya Lindholm, paracanoeist (and former team member) Edina Müller, and former team member Simone Kues.

Achievements
 2015: Gold at European Championships (Worcester, England) 
 2016: Silver at the Paralympic Games (Rio de Janeiro, Brazil)
 2017: Silver European Championships (Tenerife, Spain) 
 2018: Bronze at the World Championships (Hamburg, Germany)

Notes

German women's wheelchair basketball players
Paralympic wheelchair basketball players of Germany
1989 births
Living people
Wheelchair basketball players at the 2016 Summer Paralympics
Medalists at the 2016 Summer Paralympics
Paralympic silver medalists for Germany
Sportspeople from Guben
Paralympic medalists in wheelchair basketball